Daniela Costian (born 30 April 1965) is a former Olympic discus throw bronze medallist. She was born in Brăila, Romania, but became an Australian citizen in 1990. She competed in the discus contest at the 1992 Summer Olympics and won the bronze medal. She won a silver medal at the 1993 World Championships in Athletics.

Her personal best throw reached a distance of 73.84 m. Set in 1988, it was a Romanian record. Her best result achieved for Australia was 68.72 metres in 1994. This was both the Australian and the Oceanian record for 23 years until it was broken by Dani Stevens in August 2017.

Achievements

References

External links 

Profile at athletics.com.au

1965 births
Living people
Sportspeople from Brăila
Romanian female discus throwers
Olympic athletes of Australia
Athletes (track and field) at the 1992 Summer Olympics
Athletes (track and field) at the 1996 Summer Olympics
Olympic bronze medalists for Australia
Australian female discus throwers
Australian female shot putters
Australian people of Romanian descent
Commonwealth Games medallists in athletics
Australian Institute of Sport track and field athletes
World Athletics Championships medalists
Athletes (track and field) at the 2000 Summer Olympics
Medalists at the 1992 Summer Olympics
Olympic bronze medalists in athletics (track and field)
Commonwealth Games gold medallists for Australia
Universiade medalists in athletics (track and field)
Goodwill Games medalists in athletics
Athletes (track and field) at the 1994 Commonwealth Games
Universiade bronze medalists for Romania
Medalists at the 1985 Summer Universiade
Competitors at the 1994 Goodwill Games
Medallists at the 1994 Commonwealth Games